Babis "Bob" Katsionis (born February 17, 1977, in Athens, Greece) is the lead guitarist and keyboard player for the heavy metal/power metal bands Stray Gods, Warrior Path, Outloud, and Serious Black; until recently he was part of Firewind but as of 2020 he has since left due to personal reasons. He is considered to be Greece's most successful rock/metal keyboard player, being the only musician to ever win the same category "Best Keyboardist" in Greek Metal Hammer's Annual Readers' Polls for 5 years in a row (2006–2011). He is founder of Progressive Vision Group, a videoclip making company, which has produced more than 90 videos for rock and metal artists since 2002.
In 2014 he started his own records label "Symmetric Records" to help bands and artists he produced/worked with in Sound Symmetry Studio release their works. To date, Symmetric Records has 14 official releases, with Warrior Path's "The Mad King" being the most successful.

Appearances
Katsionis has appeared in various small-time bands over the years (Skyward, Retrospect etc.), most of them projects he developed himself, before gaining more recognition with the likes of Firewind and Outloud. 

He started playing keyboards when he was 10 years old and, four years later, began learning guitar. Bob cites Kevin Moore, Jens Johansson and Keith Emerson as his main keyboard influences. As well as playing keyboards, Bob is also a seven string guitar player and has played both instruments in his various bands. For instance, when Firewind play live, he performs in a dual role as keyboard player or rhythm guitarist (or both), depending on the song. He uses a standard six-string guitar in these circumstances. Bob also has released three instrumental albums with his solo project resembling mostly jazzy neo-classical/progressive metal. and has also joined his idol's Timo Tolkki (ex-Stratovarius) band Revolution Renaissance for the recording of their album "Trinity" without making any live appearances.

He released his 4th solo album titled "Rest In Keys" in December 2012, followed by "Prognosis & Synopsis" (2016) and the experimental album titled "Amadeus Street Warrior" which was a 16-bit fictional game soundtrack.

After Bob filled in live for Roland Grapow on their tour with Hammerfall (January–February 2015), Serious Black announced him as a full-time member in February 2015.

Bands currently featuring Bob Katsionis
Warrior Path 
Outloud
Serious Black
Stray Gods

Past bands and/or projects
Firewind
Revolution Renaissance
Kamelot (as co-writer)
Nightfall
Septic Flesh
Warrior Path
Wonders (ITA)
Validor (GR)
Casus Belli
Suicidal Angels (as guest, on Torment Payback)
Scar Of The Sun (as guest and co-writer)
Keado Mores (as guest and producer)
Encomium
Fatal Morgana (guest for Rock Of Gods 1996 Festival)
Imaginary
Power Quest (as guest)
Eldritch (as guest)
NTX (Greek crossover band Nipto Tas Xeiras)
Battleroar (as guest)
Skyward (later became Retrospect)
Mirage (later became Imaginary)
Eternal Voyager (as guest)
Tragedian (as guest on "Casting Shadows" on the album Unholy Divine)

Discography

Firewind
Forged By Fire (2005)
Allegiance (2006)
The Premonition (2008)
Days of Defiance (2010)
Few Against Many (2012)
Immortals (2017)

Outloud
We'll Rock You To Hell and Back Again (2009)
Love Catastrophe (2011)
More Catastrophe E.P (2012)
Let's Get Serious (2014)
Destination: Overdrive (The Best of Outloud) (2017)
Virtual Hero Society (2018)

Warrior Path
Warrior Path (2019)
The Mad KIng (2021)

Stray Gods
Storm The Walls (2021)

Serious Black
MirrorWorld (2016)
Magic (2017)
Vengeance Is Mine (2022)

Imaginary
Oceans Divine (2001)
Long Lost Pride (2005)

Nightfall
I am Jesus (Black Lotus records) 2002
Lyssa: Rural Gods And Astonishing Punishments (2004)

Star Queen
Faithbringer (2002)

Bob Katsionis
Turn Of My Century (2002)
Imaginary Force (2004)
Noemon (2008)
Rest in Keys (2012)
Prognosis & Synopsis (2018)
''Amadeus Street Warrior (2020)

References

External links
Myspace

Firewind members
Greek heavy metal keyboardists
Black metal musicians
Greek heavy metal guitarists
Musicians from Athens
1977 births
Living people
Greek musicians
Revolution Renaissance members